Vardanes was the name of two kings of Parthia:

 Vardanes I (c. 40–47)
 Vardanes II (c. 55–58)

See also
 Vardane Microdistrict, a microdistrict of the city of Sochi, Krasnodar Krai, Russia
 Vardane, the summit of Sulafjellet, a mountain on the island of Sula in Western Norway
 Vardan, a given name